A Far Cry from Kensington is a novel (roman à clef) by British author Muriel Spark published in 1988.

Plot introduction
Set in 1954, it is narrated by Agnes (known as Nancy) Hawkins; a young war widow lodging in a rooming house in South Kensington and working as an editor at a struggling publishing house. 
The story centres on Wanda, a highly strung Polish dressmaker who is receiving various threatening letters, and on Hector Bartlett, who appears to be stalking Agnes and through whom she loses her job. "Muriel Spark was trolled in her lifetime by an ex-lover who, by all accounts, was a pretty despicable character. This novel is her revenge on him." The story also features the pseudoscience of radionics.

Reception
Writing in The New York Times, Robert Plunkett declared that A Far Cry from Kensington was Muriel Spark's "most delightful novel in years" and explained that "the best way to convey the pleasure this novel gives is to compare it to a wonderful old Alec Guinness movie, something along the lines of The Lavender Hill Mob. True, it follows the rules of art right down the line and illuminates the human condition, etc. But it also meets a trickier challenge, that of being superb entertainment."

Publication history
1988, UK, Constable, Pub date 21 Mar 1988, Hardback
1988, US, Houghton Mifflin, Pub date Jul 1988, Hardback
1988, Canada, Viking, Hardback
1989, UK, Thorndike Press, Pub date Mar 1989, Large print (h/b)
1989, UK, Penguin, Pub date 25 May 1989, Paperback
1990, US, Avon, Pub date Jan 1990, Paperback
1990, UK, Chivers, Pub date Mar 1990, Large print (h/b)
1991, US, Listening Library, Pub date, Dec 1991, Audio cassette, read by Eleanor Bron
2000, UK, New Direction, Pub date 10 Oct 2000, Paperback
2008, UK, Virago, Pub date 1 May 2008, Hardback
2009, UK, Virago, Pug date 05 Nov 2009, Paperback
2011, UK, Blackstone, ISBN various, Audio CD/Cassette/MP3, read by Pamela Garelick

References

1988 British novels
Novels by Muriel Spark
Novels set in London
Constable & Co. books
Fiction set in 1954
Roman à clef novels